This article is about the psychobilly band. For the fictional race, see Klingon.

Klingonz are an Irish psychobilly band formed in 1988, in Dublin. Their original line-up had Titch doing lead vocals, Doyley on guitar, Strangy playing double bass and Mocker on drums. Strangy was replaced by Eddie after their second album, Blurb. Strangy joined Numbskulls. Mick of Phantom Rockers would later replace Doyley on Guitar. In 1998 this line-up recorded an EP entitled The Mad are Sane under the name Looper.

Doyley and Strangy went on to form Celtic Bones.

The band reformed with the original line-up in 2001 and continue to tour and record. In summer 2009 Doyley hacked it and left the band. Dave Deville joined on guitar in 2009, also Ray joined on Double Bass mid 2014 .

Discography

Albums
 Psycho's From Beyond (1988, Fury records/2001, Crazy Love records)
 Ghastly Things (1990 - Rumble Records)
 Blurb (1990, Fury records)
 Mong (1990, Fury records)
 Flange (1991, Fury records)
 Jobot (1992, Fury records)
 Bollox (1994, Fury records)
 Up Uranus (2003, Crazy Love records)
 Klownz'R'us (Junho 2016 - Drunkabilly Records)

Singles & EPs
 Lost In Space (2003, Ring Sting records)

Compilations
 The Best of Klingonz (1995, Fury records) 
 20 Years...Still Stompin' (2007, Ring Sting records)

References

External links
 Klingonz on Myspace
 
 Klingonz on Last.fm
 Fury Records
 Klingonz on Wreckingpit

British psychobilly musical groups
Musical groups established in 1988